DTDP-4-amino-4,6-dideoxy-D-galactose acyltransferase (TDP-fucosamine acetyltransferase, WECD, RFFC) is an enzyme with systematic name acetyl-CoA:dTDP-4-amino-4,6-dideoxy-alpha-D-galactose N-acetyltransferase. This enzyme catalyses the following chemical reaction

 acetyl-CoA + dTDP-4-amino-4,6-dideoxy-alpha-D-galactose  CoA + dTDP-4-acetamido-4,6-dideoxy-alpha-D-galactose

TDP-4-acetamido-4,6-dideoxy-D-galactose takes part in the biosynthesis of enterobacterial common antigen.

References

External links 
 

EC 2.3.1